Solange Yijika is a Cameroonian actress also much present in the Nigerian theatre and film producer, as well as an activist for women and children's rights. She is the most celebrated actress in the Central African sub-region and the main figure of the Cameroon International Film Festival (CAMIFF).

Life and education
Yijika hails from North West Cameroon. She graduated from the University of Yaoundé II, Soa, Cameroon.

Career
Yijika had been an important face in the Cameroon Film Industry since her first appearance about the year 2005. In two anti-malaria campaign posters in Cameroon sponsored by the Global Fund for the fight against Malaria, Tuberculosis and AIDS, she was used as a model in the posters. She is also a global justice activist for women and children. She was an ambassador of the first edition of the Cameroon International Film Festival (CAMIFF) in 2016.

Yijika had featured in the Cameroonian movie industry in many productions numbering about 20 and is a recipient of many award nominations including AMAA and NAFCA awards.

She starred in the "Trials of Passion" 2006 TV Series, shown on CRTV, in which she played the role of "Diana". She afterwards in 2008 featured in "Mark of the Absolute", a movie which Asaba Ferdinand directed and produced. Next was the 2009 "Land of Shadows", a movie produced by Agbor Gilbert Ebot and directed by Zack Orji and Neba Lawrence. The film also featured Jim Iyke. That same year, she also again featured in the movie "Great Pain" directed by Neba Lawrence, and later, still in the same year featured in "Royal Destiny", a Cameroonian movie which also featured Emeka Ike and Tonto Dikeh, two Nollywood actors. She, in 2012 featured in "Troubled Kingdom", a movie directed by Neba Lawrence, co-produced by the US-based film producer Mairo Sanda and South African-based Fred K. Keyanti - who praised the actress's expertise.

Still in 2012, she was starred in the Nollywood movie, "Blood or Wine", produced by Henry Neba Awantoh and Jim Iyke and directed by Neba Lawrence, screenwritten by Ruth Kadiri.

In 2013, she was nomination for the SONNAH Awards.

She appeared in the movie, "Decoded", produced by Brenda Elung - also an actress and directed by Akim Macaulay and Enah Johnscott in 2013, in which she acted alongside both Ghanaian and Cameroonian actors such as Van Vicker, Jeffery Epule and Desmond Wyte.

She was one of the two moderators on the Panel Discussion at the 2016 edition of the African Achievers Awards Ceremony, held on July 8 at the International Conference Centre, Abuja, Nigeria alongside Richard Mofe Damijo, a Nigerian actor and politician.

In the 2017 movie, "Expression the Courage to Heal", directed by Musing Derick Tening and produced by Tessy Eseme, she played the role of "Jazmine Juma". The movie was premiered in London.

She was nominated for an award in the second edition of the CAMIFF Awards, held between April 24–29, 2017 at Buea, Cameroon with other Camerwood and Nollywood actors also nominated. She was one of the sponsors of the CAMIFF 2018 edition alongside Nollywood's Ramsey Nouah.

Filmography

Accolades

See also
 List of Cameroonian actors

References

External links
 Solange Yijika Biography on IMDb
 
 
 Meet Top Cameroonian Actress, Solange Yijika on Celebrity Buzz

Cameroonian actresses
Cameroonian film producers
Cameroonian women film producers
Cameroonian activists
Living people
Year of birth missing (living people)